Khiladiyon Ka Khiladi ( Player of Players) is a 1996 Indian Hindi-language action film starring Rekha in her first villain role, Akshay Kumar, Raveena Tandon and former WWF (now WWE) wrestlers "Crush" and Brian Lee as "The Undertaker". It was the 6th highest-grossing movie of the year 1996. It was the fourth installment in the Khiladi series.

Plot
The film is about a deadly game of survival in the ruthless world of crime and sleaze.  A criminal don, Maya, hosts illegal wrestling matches in U.S (New York) and has the full support of the local Police Commissioner. Ajay Malhotra has relocated to US and has started his own orchestra with the help of some of his friends.

His brother, Akshay, decides to visit him on hearing that he wants to marry his beloved in Canada; on the airplane he meets Priya, and both fall in love. Once in the U.S., Akshay finds out that the police have a warrant for the arrest of Ajay and want to question him. Akshay's attempts to locate Ajay land him with Maya, who happens to be Priya's sister. Apparently Maya is holding Ajay and will only release him after he hands over incriminating documents. Akshay soon wins Maya's confidence by rescuing her from attempts on her life made by King Don, and Maya begins to like him and trust him. Akshay then proposes to her, to which Maya agrees, much to the disappointment of Priya.

Soon Akshay kills Maya's men when they get to know of his true identity. He also organises a fake kidnap drama with Ajay's friends, who kidnap him and demand that Maya come to meet them with Ajay. By now Maya realizes that Akshay is Ajay's brother, and Priya actually loves Akshay. Maya calls the kidnappers and arranges a meeting the following night. News of this has spread to a hospitalised Ajay, who decides to intervene in the meeting. But is again captured by Maya's men. Maya then stages a shootout threatening Priya, Akshay and Ajay, but are interrupted by the cops and King Don. King Don is then defeated by everyone else present. At the end, Maya commits suicide, and before dying she hands over her sister Priya and Ajay to Akshay.

Cast

 Rekha as Madam Maya
 Akshay Kumar as Akshay Kharodia Malhotra 
 Raveena Tandon as Priya Malhotra
 Inder Kumar as Ajay Malhotra
 Barkha Madan as Jane
 Gulshan Grover as King Don
 Dolly Bindra as Bhagwanti
 Deven Verma 
 Brian Adams as Crush (WWF character)
 Brian Lee as The Undertaker (WWF character)
 Anjana Mumtaz as Mrs. Malhotra
 Tiku Talsania as Priya's Uncle
 Kishore Bhanushali as Dev, Ajay's Friend
 Imran Khan as Vicky,Popo Twins Ajay Akshay's Friend 
 Gavin Packard as Gavin
 Dinesh Anand

Music
The film soundtrack contains 7 songs composed by Anu Malik.

Production 
The movie has been shot in locations across Canada and Russia.

Home Media
The DVD of the movie was released by Eros International. The television premiere of the movie was occurred on Star Plus in 1997. The film has been made streaming available on Zee5 since 2022 .

Awards

References

External links

1996 films
1990s Hindi-language films
Films scored by Anu Malik
Films set in Canada
Films set in the United States
Films shot in Canada
Films shot in Russia
Professional wrestling films
Films directed by Umesh Mehra
Indian crime action films
1990s crime action films